The White Giraffe is a children's novel by Lauren St John first published in 2006. It is the first in the African Adventures series. Lauren St. John picked out a giraffe for the story because she always wanted to ride one. When St. John was a child living in Zimbabwe, Africa, she owned several wild animals including a giraffe. This book was the winner of the 2008 East Sussex Children’s Book Award.

The book is about a girl, Martine, who moves to an African game reserve to live with her grandmother after her parents die in a house fire.

References

External links

A library newsletter that contains a review of the book
The White Giraffe at the author's website

2006 British novels
British children's novels
Fictional giraffes
Novels set in South Africa
Novels about orphans
Children's novels about animals
2006 children's books
Orion Books books